Mordechai Shapiro (born 1989) is an American singer, songwriter and entertainer in the Orthodox pop industry. He has been described as having the "ability to do things with his voice no one else in this business can" by Jewish music producer Yitzy Waldner.

Biography 
Mordechai Shapiro was born in 1989 in Monsey, New York. His father was a chazzan and his mother had a background as a trained opera singer. Growing up in a Modern Orthodox household, he attended Ashar (Adolph Schreiber Hebrew Academy) for elementary school, and the Marsha Stern Talmudical Academy for high school. Following his graduation from high school, Shapiro learned in yeshiva in Yeshiva Netiv Aryeh and Yeshivas Bais Yisroel.

In 2010, Shapiro married Raquel Guenoun.

Career 
Shapiro made his musical debut in 1997 as the star soloist of the Miami Boys Choir. As a child, he performed with Jewish entertainers such as Yaakov Shwekey even before he gained significant attention. He left Miami Boys Choir in 2003 when his voice became too deep to fit into a children's choir.

After leaving the choir, Shapiro took a break from music until his voice transitioned sufficiently. He was a student of voice teacher William Riley, who also taught Celine Dion and Josh Groban. Eventually, he began performing at weddings and other Jewish events as an independent artist.

Shapiro's solo career debuted in 2016 when he was signed by producer Yitzy Waldner, with the release of his album Kol Haderech, peaking at #15 on the Billboard World Music chart. The album was followed by Machar in 2017, peaking at #3, and Hakol Mishamayim in 2019, peaking at #7. Shapiro is also known for his extravagant music videos- often including elaborate sets and dancers, showcasing his larger than life personality. His hit video for "Hakol Mishamayim" sits just under 10 Million views on YouTube. Hakol Mishamayim was filmed by Shimmy Socol, alongside Machar, Friends, Ein Od Milvado, also filmed by Socol.

Shapiro has cited Frank Sinatra, Michael Jackson and Michael Bublé as his musical influences.

Discography
Kol Haderech (2016)
Machar (2017)
Hakol Mishamayim (2019)
Sing It (Freilach Band) (2021)
Achas (2022)

References 

1990 births
Living people
People from Monsey, New York
American Modern Orthodox Jews
Jewish American musicians
Jewish songwriters
21st-century American Jews
Orthodox pop musicians